The City of North Vancouver is a city on the north shore of Burrard Inlet, British Columbia, Canada. It is the smallest in area and the most urbanized of the North Shore municipalities. Although it has significant industry of its ownincluding shipping, chemical production, and film productionthe city is considered to be a suburb of Vancouver. The city is served by the Royal Canadian Mounted Police, British Columbia Ambulance Service, and the North Vancouver City Fire Department.

History
In the 1880s, Arthur Heywood-Lonsdale and a relation James Pemberton Fell, made substantial investments through their company, Lonsdale Estates, and in 1882 he financed the Moodyville investments. Several locations in the North Vancouver area are named after Lonsdale and his family.

Not long after the District was formed, an early land developer and second reeve of the new council, James Cooper Keith, personally underwrote a loan to commence construction of a road which undulated from West Vancouver to Deep Cove amid the slashed sidehills, swamps, and burnt stumps. The road, sometimes under different names and not always contiguous, is still one of the most important east-west thoroughfare carrying traffic across the North Shore.

Development was slow at the outset. The population of the District in the 1901 census was only 365 people. Keith joined Edwin Mahon and together they controlled North Vancouver Land & Improvement Company. Soon the pace of development around the foot of Lonsdale began to pick up. The first school was opened in 1902. The District was able to build a municipal hall in 1903 and actually have meetings in North Vancouver (instead of in Vancouver where most of the landowners lived). The first bank and first newspaper arrived in 1905. In 1906 the BC Electric Railway Company opened up a street car line that extended from the ferry wharf up Lonsdale to 12th Street. By 1911 the streetcar system extended west to the Capilano River and east to Lynn Valley.

The owners of businesses who operated on Lonsdale, as part of an initiative led by Keith and Mahon, brought a petition to District Council in 1905 calling for a new, compact city to be carved out of the unwieldy district.

During the ensuing two years there was much and sometimes heated debate. Some thought the new City should have a new name such as Northport, Hillmont or Parkhill. Burrard became the favourite of the new names but majority view was that North Vancouver remain in order to remain associated with the rising credibility of Vancouver in financial markets and as a place to attract immigrants.

Some thought the boundary of the new City should reflect geography and extend from Lynn Creek or Seymour River west to the Capilano River and extend three miles up the mountainside. That the boundary of the City which came into existence in 1907 just happened to match that of the lands owned by the North Vancouver Land & Improvement Company and Lonsdale Estate was no accident. Since the motivation for creating the City was to reserve local tax revenue for the work of putting in services for the property owned by the major developers, there was little reason to take on any of the burden beyond the extent of their holdings.

Residents in west part of the District of North Vancouver now had less reason to be connected with what remained and they petitioned to create the District of West Vancouver (the west part of the North Shore, not the west side of Vancouver) in 1912. The eastern boundary of that new municipality is for the most part the Capilano River and a community that is easily distinguished from the two North Vancouvers has since developed.

The City of North Vancouver continued to grow around the foot of Lonsdale Avenue. Serviced by the North Vancouver Ferries, it proved a popular area. Commuters used the ferries to work in Vancouver. Street cars and early land speculation, spurred interest in the area. Streets, city blocks and houses were slowly built around lower Lonsdale. Wallace Shipyards, and the Pacific Great Eastern Railway provided an industrial base, although, the late arrival of the Second Narrows railway bridge in 1925 controlled development.
 The Depression again bankrupted the city, while the Second World War turned North Vancouver into the Clydeside of Canada with a large shipbuilding program. Housing the shipyard workers provided a new building boom, which continued on through the post-war years. By that time, North Vancouver became a popular housing area.

Geography

The City of North Vancouver is separated from Vancouver by the Burrard Inlet, and it is surrounded on three sides by the District of North Vancouver. The city has much in common with the District Municipality of North Vancouver and together with West Vancouver are commonly referred to as the North Shore.

The City of North Vancouver is relatively densely populated with a number of residential high-rise buildings in the Central Lonsdale and Lower Lonsdale areas.

The North Shore mountains have many drainages: Capilano River, MacKay, Mosquito, and Lynn Creeks, and Seymour River.

Climate
North Vancouver has an oceanic climate (Köppen Cfb) with cool, rainy winters and dry, warm summers.

Politics

Sites of interest
The area around lower Lonsdale Avenue features several open community spaces, including Waterfront Park, Lonsdale Quay, Ship Builders Square and the Burrard Dry Dock Pier.

Other sites of interest in the city include:
 Centennial Theatre, 2300 Lonsdale Avenue
 First Church of Christ, Scientist, a local heritage site
 North Vancouver Museum & Archives, 209 West 4th Street
 The Polygon Gallery
 Presentation House Theatre, 333 Chesterfield Avenue
 St. Edmund's Church, 535 Mahon Avenue, a local heritage site
 Trans Canada Trail Pavilion, Waterfront Park
 The Shipyards, near Lonsdale Quay, which includes Ship Builders Square and the Burrard Dry Dock Pier, on the site of the old Wallace Shipyard
Lonsdale Quay Market, easily accessible from the Seabus. The Quay has a view of Vancouver's skyline and is locally owned and operated.

Transportation

The City of North Vancouver is connected to Vancouver by two highway bridges (the Lions Gate Bridge and the Ironworkers Memorial Second Narrows Crossing) and by a passenger ferry, the SeaBus. That system and the bus system in North Vancouver is operated by Coast Mountain Bus Company, an operating company of TransLink. The hub of the bus system is Lonsdale Quay, the location of the SeaBus terminal. Currently, there is no rail transit service on the North Shore.

The main street in the city is Lonsdale Avenue, which begins at Lonsdale Quay and goes north to 29th Street, where it continues in the District of North Vancouver, ending at Rockland Road.

Highway 1, the Trans-Canada Highway (often referred to as the "Upper Levels Highway") passes through the northern portion of the city. It is a freeway for its entire length within the City of North Vancouver. There are three interchanges on Highway 1 within the City of North Vancouver:

Lynn Valley Road (Exit 19)
Lonsdale Avenue (Exit 18)
Westview Drive (Exit 17)

Education

Public schools are managed by the North Vancouver School District, which operates 8 high schools and 30 elementary schools shared by the city and the District of North Vancouver.

The Conseil scolaire francophone de la Colombie-Britannique operates one Francophone school in that city: école André-Piolat, which has both primary and secondary levels.

There are also several independent private elementary and high schools in the area, including Bodwell High School and Lions Gate Christian Academy.

Post-secondary education is available at Capilano University in the district, as well as at Simon Fraser University and the University of British Columbia in neighbouring communities.

Demographics

As of the 2011 census, the median age was 41.2 years old, which is a bit higher than the national median age at 40.6 years old. There are 24,206 private dwellings with an occupancy rate of 94.1%. According to the 2011 National Household Survey, the median value of a dwelling in North Vancouver is $599,985 which is significantly higher than the national average at $280,552. The median household income (after-taxes) in North Vancouver is $52,794, a bit lower than the national average at $54,089.

Ethnicity 
North Vancouver has one of the highest Middle Eastern population ratios for any Canadian city at 11.3% as of 2021. 

Note: Totals greater than 100% due to multiple origin responses.

Languages 
Mother languages as reported by each person:

3.1% of North Vancouver residents listed both English and a non-official language as mother tongues.

Religion 
According to the 2021 census, religious groups in North Vancouver included:
Irreligion (29,580 persons or 51.4%)
Christianity (20,915 persons or 36.4%)
Islam (4,245 persons or 7.4%)
Sikhism (530 persons or 0.9%)
Buddhism (470 persons or 0.8%)
Judaism (385 persons or 0.7%)
Hinduism (340 persons or 0.6%)
Indigenous Spirituality (70 persons or 0.1%)

Notes

References

External links

 
Cities in British Columbia
Populated places on the British Columbia Coast